Jongchon-dong is a borough (dong) of Sejong City, South Korea.

External links 
 Jongchon-dong (Korean)

Neighbourhoods in Sejong City